Justo Gallego Martínez (20 September 1925 – 28 November 2021); also known by his honorific byname Don Justo, was a Spaniard who was known for constructing a church building in the dimensions of a cathedral on his own in the town of Mejorada del Campo since 1961. Most of the construction materials used were recycled or made from "junk". Don Justo dedicated the building to Our Lady of the Pillar.

Early life and inspiration
Justo Gallego Martínez grew up as a farmer. His mother, who was very pious, instilled in him a strong Catholic faith. According to his own words he loved the Church and "put everything on this". Justo's school education was interrupted by the Spanish Civil War. At the age of ten he witnessed communist forces, who were fighting Francisco Franco, shooting priests and ransacking the church in Mejorada del Campo; the events left him with little respect for the town's socialist administration. 

As a young man, he entered a Trappist monastery as a novice. In 1961, he had to leave prior to making his final vows, when he contracted tuberculosis and his health deteriorated because of the ascetic way of life of the Trappists.

The "Cathedral"

Justo had promised that if he recovered from the tuberculosis which had struck him down, he would build a shrine in honour of Our Lady of the Pillar, to whom he had prayed. So, he began to build on a plot of land he had inherited from his parents. On October 12, 1961 (the feast of the Our Lady of the Pillar), Gallego commenced building. There never were formal plans for the building, which locally was called "the cathedral from junk". Justo initially just levelled the ground and mapped out the ground-works on site. The building has evolved over time in response to opportunity and inspiration. Design inspirations have included St. Peter's Basilica in the Vatican City, the White House in the US, and various castles and churches in Spain.

Below the main building there is a crypt and adjacent there is a complex of minor chapels, cloisters, lodgings and a library.

Most of the building materials and tools used for construction are recycled. This includes everyday objects and excess construction materials donated by construction companies and a nearby brick factory. For instance, the columns have been moulded with old petrol drums. The building work has been carried out without any crane.

Gallego usually began his workday at 6am and worked for ten hours a day, except on Sundays. Eusebio Sanchez Dominges, the parish priest, described Justo as a devout man who attended Mass every Sunday.

Support and finance

Although Justo Gallego worked mainly alone for nearly 60 years, he was assisted by a local named Ángel López Sánchez. He had also been supported by his six nephews (who, for example, helped placing the girders for the dome) and by occasional volunteers. Occasionally, he consulted an expert at his own expense. In 2005, an advertising campaign for the Aquarius soft drink gave him and his cathedral Spain-wide exposure. Gallego lived with his sister nearby. He has financed his work by selling and renting some of his inherited farmland. Private donations from supporters and visitors are also given.

According to local media, shortly before his death, Don Justo bequeathed his enormous building to the non-governmental organization Messengers of Peace, which committed itself to completing his life's work.

Construction permits
A certified architect has offered pro bono services to aid in legalizing the building.

The building does not have formal planning permission or building permits from the authorities of Mejorada del Campo or support of the Catholic Church. The town authorities, however, have named the street on which the project has been rising "Calle Antonio Gaudí", after the architect behind another famous unfinished church, the Sagrada Familia.

Reception
A brief documentary on Don Gallego's work was produced in 2006 by the Latin American version of The Discovery Channel, where Gallego explained his vision. The work has also been noted in the Museum of Modern Art in New York City. It is also the subject of the 2009 short documentary, Catedral. In 2016, he was featured in a two minute video on Great Big Story.

In 2017, Alex Polizzi featured the "Catedral" in Episode 5 of her Channel 5 travelogue programme, Spectacular Spain.

Pan Seco (Spain, 2020) is a documentary directed by Román Cadafalch and Cadhla Kennedy. The documentary portrays the day to day of this peculiar space in the outskirts of the big Spanish capital. With strokes of surrealism, the story dives into the psyche of these two ambivalent characters that make up the bizarre microcosm of the “Cathedral of Faith”.

Death
Gallego Martínez died in Madrid on November 28, 2021, at the age of 96. He had died within the Cathedral and had reportedly requested that he be buried in its crypt, but was buried instead in Mejorada del Campo’s cemetery after local government officials found that the crypt did not meet Spanish sanitation rules.

See also
 Outsider art

References

External links

 1994 - 'Don Justo And His Cathedral' - Dutch TV film, 30 minutes - by: Willem Davids
  by Aliocha and by Alessio Rigo de Righi
 Short film following Justo building the cathedral over 4 years by James Rogan (2009)
 Justo Gallegos' Cathedral, photos and videos
 Le chantier de Dieu in GEO 360° (ARTE TV)
 "Justo Gallego y la Catedral de la Virgen del Pilar en Mejorada del Campo, la otra historia"

1925 births
2021 deaths
People from the Community of Madrid
Trappists
Spanish Roman Catholics
Former members of Catholic religious institutes
Spanish ecclesiastical architects
Outsider artists
Recycled art artists